Cochran's least gecko (Sphaerodactylus cochranae) is a species of lizard in the family Sphaerodactylidae. The species is endemic to the Dominican Republic.

Etymology
The specific name, cochranae, is in honor of American herpetologist Doris Mable Cochran.

Habitat

Reproduction
S. cochranae is oviparous.

References

Further reading
Powell R, Henderson RW (2008). "Sphaerodactylus cochranae ". Catalogue of American Amphibians and Reptiles (851): 1-2.
Powell, Robert; Ottenwalder, José A.; Incháustegui, Sixto J.; Henderson, Robert W.; Glor, Richard E. (2000). "Amphibians and reptiles of the Dominican Republic: Species of special concern". Oryx 34 (2): 118-128.
Rösler H (2000). "Kommentierte Liste der rezent, subrezent und fossil bekannten Geckotaxa (Reptilia: Gekkonomorpha) ". Gekkota 2: 28-153. (Sphaerodactylus cochranae, p. 111). (in German).
Ruibal, "Rudolph [sic]" (1946). "A New Sphaerodactylus from the Dominican Republic". American Museum Novitates (1308): 1-4. (Sphaerodactylus cochranae, new species).
Schwartz A, Henderson RW (1991). Amphibians and Reptiles of the West Indies: Descriptions, Distributions, and Natural History. Gainesville, Florida: University of Florida Press. 720 pp. . (Sphaerodactylus cochranae, p. 480).
Schwartz A, Thomas R (1975). A Check-list of West Indian Amphibians and Reptiles. Carnegie Museum of Natural History Special Publication No. 1. Pittsburgh, Pennsylvania: Carnegie Museum of Natural History. 216 pp. (Sphaerodactylus cochranae, p. 146).
Thomas R, Schwartz A (1983). "Part 2. Sphaerodactylus savagei, S. cochranae, S. darlingtoni, S. armstrongi, S. streptophorus, and conclusions". pp. 31–60. In: Schwartz A, Thomas R (1983). "The difficilis complex of Sphaerodactylus (Sauria, Gekkonidae) of Hispaniola". Bulletin of Carnegie Museum of Natural History (22): 1-60.

Sphaerodactylus
Reptiles of the Dominican Republic
Endemic fauna of the Dominican Republic
Reptiles described in 1946
Taxa named by Rodolfo Ruibal